Mutthaide Bhagya may refer to:

 Mutthaide Bhagya (1956 film), a Kannada-language film directed by B. Vittalacharya
 Mutthaide Bhagya (1983 film), a Kannada-language film directed by K N Chandrashekar Sharma